Klavdiya Studennikova (born 14 November 1958) is a Ukrainian former swimmer. She competed in two events at the 1976 Summer Olympics for the Soviet Union.

References

External links
 

1958 births
Living people
Ukrainian female swimmers
Olympic swimmers of the Soviet Union
Swimmers at the 1976 Summer Olympics
Medalists at the 1977 Summer Universiade
Sportspeople from Kyiv
Universiade medalists in swimming
Universiade gold medalists for the Soviet Union
Universiade silver medalists for the Soviet Union
Soviet female swimmers
National University of Ukraine on Physical Education and Sport alumni